The Dead Daisies are an Australian-American rock supergroup and collective formed in 2012 in Sydney, Australia by David Lowy. Musicians that have joined Lowy for the project have included Richard Fortus (Guns N' Roses), Jon Stevens (INXS, Noiseworks), Darryl Jones
(The Rolling Stones), Dizzy Reed (Guns N' Roses), Marco Mendoza (Thin Lizzy, Whitesnake), Charley Drayton (The Cult, Divinyls, Cold Chisel), John Tempesta (The Cult, Exodus, Testament), Frank Ferrer (Guns N' Roses), Alex Carapetis (Nine Inch Nails), Clayton Doley, Jackie Barnes (Jimmy Barnes), John Corabi (The Scream, Mötley Crüe), Alan Mansfield, Brian Tichy (Whitesnake, Foreigner, Ozzy Osbourne), Doug Aldrich (Whitesnake, Bad Moon Rising, Dio, Burning Rain, Revolution Saints), Deen Castronovo (Journey, Bad English, Hardline, Ozzy Osbourne, Revolution Saints) and Glenn Hughes (Trapeze, Deep Purple, Black Country Communion).

History

Formation, debut album, and first tour (2013)
The Dead Daisies were formed by Jon Stevens and David Lowy (ex-Mink) in 2012. The singer-songwriter and guitarist got together after David Edwards, ex-manager of INXS, reintroduced them.

The band's self-titled debut album was recorded in two weeks at Wishbone Studios in Los Angeles in 2013 with American producer/engineer and multi-instrumentalist John Fields. The album was released in North America on 9 August 2013 through Caroline/Universal, and later released in the United Kingdom in mid-November 2013. "Lock N' Load", their first single, was co-written by Slash, who also played guitar on the track. The song was a Rolling Stone magazine Daily Download on 25 July 2013 and was also available on the website of BBC Radio 2. The song's music video appeared on more than 20 outlets including Much Music. The single was released in the United Kingdom on 28 October 2013.

The band toured in 2013, including opening for ZZ Top and joining Aerosmith on their Australian and New Zealand tour. This was followed by the 25-date Rockstar Energy Drink Uproar Festival in August and September 2013 (with Jane's Addiction and Alice in Chains, among others). These shows were performed by the first full lineup of the band, which consisted of Lowy and Stevens along with drummer Frank Ferrer, guitarist Richard Fortus, bassist Marco Mendoza (Whitesnake/Thin Lizzy), and pianist Dizzy Reed (from Guns N' Roses). Lead singer Stevens performed for a while with casts on his hand and leg as a result of an injury sustained when escaping from a crocodile on a fishing excursion in Australia.

Lineup changes and Cuba Rocks (2013–2015)
In September 2013, the Dead Daisies replaced Frank Ferrer with Brian Tichy on drums but in the fall of 2013 played 18 shows in the United Kingdom with the Black Star Riders with new recruits Charley Drayton on drums and Darryl Jones on bass (instead of Brian Tichy and Marco Mendoza, respectively). On 20 November, they played the Underworld rock club in Camden, their first UK show as headliners. The band finished off their touring schedule in 2013 with a gig at The Barby in Tel Aviv, Israel.

"Lock N' Load" was also played at football stadiums, including at Wembley Stadium during the sold out NFL American football game between the Jacksonville Jaguars and the San Francisco 49ers on 27 October.

Coinciding with the tour of the UK, Britain's Classic Rock magazine included a feature of the Dead Daisies in its November 2013 issue. The band was also November's spotlight artist for both Metal Hammer and Classic Rocks websites. In a Classic Rock magazine poll, Lock N' Load was voted 15th best song of 2013 out of 100 songs.

In February 2014, the Dead Daisies regrouped with the line-up of Lowy, Stevens, Fortus, and Reed, with a returning Mendoza and new drummer John Tempesta (The Cult) to undertake their first full headline Australian tour plus shows supporting Australian rocker Jimmy Barnes for two shows: Twilight At Taronga, at Taronga Zoo Sydney, and at the Bateau Bay Hotel.

The band (with Brian Tichy again) embarked on two US tours in 2014, joining the Bad Company/Lynyrd Skynyrd tour in July, followed by the Heroes Tour with Kiss/Def Leppard in August.

During the summer of 2014, the Dead Daisies released the EP Face I Love with four new recordings, including "Face I Love", "Angel in Your Eyes", "Your Karma", and a cover of the Beatles' "Helter Skelter". Along with the EP, a Facebook app was launched where fans would send in pictures of themselves to try and win prizes.

At the end of October 2014, the Dead Daisies were invited to join the 4th KISS Kruise, which sailed from Miami to the Bahamas.

The band would finish their touring commitments in 2014 with a second visit to New Zealand as guests of Jimmy Barnes under the banner of the 'Angel In Your Eyes' tour to coincide with the release of the same titled single, with four dates in Auckland, Dunedin, Christchurch and Hamilton, followed by a headline tour of Australia. The Dead Daisies played their first ever headline shows in Perth on 4 December and Brisbane on the 5th.

In late February 2015, the Dead Daisies became the first American rock band to play Cuba since the Obama administration reopened trade ties and made history as part of a cultural exchange as guests of the Cuban Ministry of Culture, Cuban Institute of Music and the Cuban Rock Agency. This tour saw Lowy, Fortus, Tichy and Reed joined by returning bassist Darryl Jones, in addition to which vocalists John Corabi and Bernard Fowler joined the band in place of the absent Stevens. During their visit, the band jammed in studio with Cuban musicians, played an energetic sold-out show at Havana's Maxim Rock Club, visited young Cuban musicians at the National Institute of Music and finished with a performance at the Concert for Peace (Roc Por La Paz) in front of over 6,000 fans. It was an unforgettable week as the band members immersed themselves in Cuban culture. David Lowy said it was "one of the best musical experiences of my life".

Jon Stevens' departure, John Corabi confirmation and Revolución (2015)
On 16 April 2015, the Dead Daisies officially announced John Corabi would remain with the band as lead vocalist, and that Jon Stevens would no longer be a member of the group. The band headed for Sydney, Australia, and with drummer Jackie Barnes (instead of Brian Tichy), son of Jimmy Barnes, sitting in, booked into Studios 301 with co-producer Craig Porteils (Guns N' Roses/Billy Idol), to complete the recording of their second album, Revolución.

In June 2015 the band (featuring Tommy Clufetos on drums) supported KISS again on their European tour, and also took in the Rock in Vienna Festival, Download Festival UK and Graspop Metal Meeting Belgium. The Dead Daisies continued to support the KISS tour on its Australian leg in October 2015 with Brian Tichy on drums.

In late July 2015, the Dead Daisies joined Whitesnake for a limited tour run in the US that ran until mid August. The groups met up for their first US show in Westbury, New York and finished things off in St. Charles, Missouri bringing American audiences the much anticipated album Revolución  as well as the world premiere of the documentary, titled the same, of their historic trip to Cuba on Twitter.
In October 2015, the Dead Daisies (with returning Brian Tichy) joined KISS for the Australian leg of the KISS Tour finishing things up on the KISS Kruise V.
In November 2015, the Dead Daisies rejoined Whitesnake in Moscow, Russia touring across Europe, making a stop to join Judas Priest in Frankfurt, Germany.

Doug Aldrich, Make Some Noise, and Live and Louder (2016–2017)
On 28 January 2016, it was announced that Richard Fortus  (2013–2016) and Dizzy Reed  (2013–2016) would be taking part in the massive Guns N' Roses "Not in This Lifetime... Tour" and that Doug Aldrich – Lead Guitar (2016–present) would be joining the band. With Aldrich, the band recorded their new album Make Some Noise in Nashville with producer Marti Frederiksen (Aerosmith, Gavin Rossdale, Mötley Crüe, Buckcherry) during February & March 2016. Make Some Noise was released globally on SPV Records on 5 August. The band also announced European dates and a US tour with KISS for the summer as well as their first Japanese show at Loud Park festival in October.

The Dead Daisies kicked off their 2016 live appearances as special guests at Musikmesse Frankfurt with performances on the main stage followed by a guest slot with all-star band The Hollywood Vampires in Germany. On 14 July the group set off on the Make Some Noise Tour at Bang Your Head Festival in Balingen, Germany. The Dead Daisies played several more festivals as well as their own sold-out shows throughout the UK and Europe including an acoustic show at Hard Rock Cafe in Prague and at Maidstone's prestigious 'Ramblin' Man Fair' on 23 July 2016, finishing their European run at Komplex 457 in Zurich, Switzerland. The band released their much anticipated third studio album 'Make Some Noise' on 5 August 2016.

On 10 August 2016, the Dead Daisies joined KISS on their "Freedom To Rock Tour" with shows across the US. For the first time, the Dead Daisies included headline concerts in Los Angeles at the famous Whisky-A-Go-Go and Webster Hall in New York. After doing a show for fans of the NFL team Arizona Cardinals, The album's title track 'Make Some Noise' was adopted for their touchdown song.

In October, the Dead Daisies paid their first visit to the Japan, to play the Loud Park Festival. They continued their journey with their first USO Tour playing shows for the US Military services in South Korea. In early November, the band rejoined KISS on the KISS Kruise VI for a record third time, then set off for a massive UK and European trek on a co-headline tour with Irish rock band the Answer to finish off 2016 with tickets selling out well in advance.

On 19 May 2017, the Dead Daisies released their new album titled Live And Louder featuring sixteen songs recorded during the UK/Europe Tour from the fall of 2016. Included is a 'Live And Louder' documentary DVD showcasing the 'Make Some Noise World Tour' and selected acoustic tracks along with a massive photo booklet. A headline tour throughout the world is now heading to the US via a special concert at Woodstock in Poland with a full orchestra.

The band has performed at the cream of the European Festivals including Download Festival, Sweden Rock Festival, Rock Hard Festival, Hellfest and Graspop Metal Meeting. Enthusiastic Japanese fans had clamored for the band to return to 'The Land of the Rising Sun' so they did to two sold-out shows in Osaka and Tokyo in July. After leaving Japan, the band headed to South America for the first time and played concerts in Brazil, Argentina and Chile before playing a sold-out gig in Mexico City.

In a major spectacular, the band played the Woodstock Festival (Poland) in Poland along with the Gorzów Philharmonic Orchestra to hundreds of thousands in the audience before heading back to the US for their first headline tour. Aptly titled 'The Dirty Dozen' kicked off in August and saw the band storm through major cities across North America including New York, Chicago, Toronto, Los Angeles and finishing up in Las Vegas. They have partnered with sports organizations like the New York Yankees and NASCAR as well as working on a promotion with Harley-Davidson including three exclusive biker shows at Sturgis Full Throttle Saloon on 9 August and two shows at the start of September, the Easyriders Rodeo Tour in Ohio and the National HOG Rally in Milwaukee.

Deen Castronovo and Burn It Down (2017–2018)
On 4 November 2017, it was announced that Deen Castronovo would be taking over drumming duties moving forward after Brian Tichy's departure. As of this date the band, with Corabi, Aldrich, Lowy, Mendoza and Castronovo, was in Nashville, Tennessee began the recording of a new album.

In January 2018, the band announced its pending album Burn It Down, released on 6 April. The album is available in multiple formats including: CD, colored vinyl, picture disk vinyl and digital download. The band simultaneously announced a 26-date UK and European tour beginning 8 April in Glasgow, UK.

On 9 March, The Dead Daisies released the first single from the new album "Burn It Down". The song, 'Rise Up' is a protest song asking everyone to rise up against everything that is wrong with the world today.

The band started a European tour on 16 April after spending a week in the UK playing their first ever sold-out tour. In June, the band played three shows in Japan. Throughout July, the band played a series of dates including festivals in Europe and guest slots with the Scorpions in Portugal and Guns N' Roses in Estonia.

The Dead Daisies began their North America tour on 15 August, touring 24 cities with former band member Dizzy Reed making a special appearance as part of the support act Hookers & Blow.

The band headed to the Kiss Kruise at the end of October for the fourth time where they set sail for Key West and Nassau. After this they headed straight to the UK and Europe for a series of dates including Hard Rock Hell, Monstersfest and WinterStorm. Dates in Italy, France, Croatia, Hungary, Austria, Holland, Belgium, Spain, Portugal and Germany took them to the middle of December 2018 and the end of the tour.

Welcome to Daisyland and Locked and Loaded (2019)
February 2019 saw the launch of a brand new online horror series called 'Welcome to Daisyland'. The Dead Daisies feature in some of the episodes and their music from the 2018 album 'Burn It Down' is used as the soundtrack. Some of the songs featured include 'Dead and Gone' and 'Burn It Down'. On 14 February, new single 'Dead and Gone' swamp version, which is an acoustic version of the track, was released in conjunction with the first episode.

With the various members of the band working on solo projects, the band are off the road. Apart from the 'Welcome To Daisyland' horror series, they have also released a series of cover versions recorded at acoustic performances which have included 'My Generation' by The Who,'Ramble On' by Led Zeppelin, 'Maggie May' by Rod Stewart and 'We're An American Band' by Grand Funk Railroad. 'Song and a Prayer' and 'Fortunate Son' acoustic versions which were originally recorded for an American Airlines promotion were then released on the Spotify platform.

On 7 June 2019, the debut album from 2013, was available for the first time in a vinyl format.

German music duo twocolors did a mix of the track "Make Some Noise", released as a dance mix titled "Make It Louder".

On 23 August 2019, the band released Locked and Loaded, a collection of cover songs recorded both live and in the studio. "Fortunate Son" and "Join Together" were available on digital platforms before the album was released.

Glenn Hughes, "Righteous Days", Holy Ground and Radiance (2019–present)
In September 2019, the band debuted a new track 'Righteous Days' on Planet Rock Radio in the UK. It was also announced that Glenn Hughes would be joining the collective as lead singer and bassist.

In November 2019, the band headed to the South of France to begin writing and recording the next album, which would be the first with Glenn Hughes. They spent two weeks in November then a further two weeks in December at La Fabrique Studios in Saint-Rémy de Provence (south of France) working with producer Ben Grosse. The new album will be released in 2020.

At the beginning of 2020, finishing touches and final mixing of the next album was completed with producer Ben Grosse. In February, a European tour starting at the end of May 2020 and stretching until well into July was announced but later postponed due to the COVID-19 pandemic. In June it was announced that the band would be playing a few shows with Foreigner in Germany and Poland starting in Hamburg on 6 June 2021. In addition, it was announced that the band would also do a number of dates in Europe in Summer 2021 with Judas Priest. On 17 April, 'Unspoken' the first single from the forthcoming album was released. On May 15, US dance duo Dance With The Dead released a remix version of 'Unspoken'. On 17 July 2020 'The Lockdown Sessions' EP was released by the band on digital platforms. The band later announced that the release of Holy Ground, as well as a supporting tour, had been pushed back to 22 January 2021. The next single to be released by the band was 'Bustle and Flow' on the 25 September. The song reached 15 on the Billboard Mainstream Rock Chart. On the 4 December the next single 'Holy Ground' which is also the title track of the forthcoming album was released and was added to the Planet Rock 'A' playlist. On 11 January the European tour due to start in February was postponed due to the worldwide pandemic.

2021 saw the release of the fifth studio album Holy Ground. The album came out on the 22 January and was met with global praise from both fans and music critics featuring 11 songs including three singles to date, the album reached the top 10 on many international rock charts. It was announced drummer Tommy Clufetos, formerly in the band for the European tour in 2015 would make a return for future live shows. On 5 March, the latest song to be promoted by the band was 'Chosen and Justified' which had proved a popular track on the album among fans. On April 30 the band announced a set of warm-up dates around the US in June and July. On 7 May, The Dead Daisies had a series of big announcements and releases. 'Like No Other', the fifth single was released with a new mix including returning drummer Tommy Clufetos playing the drums. This was accompanied by video animation which also tied into a brand new mobile video game 'Daisys Revenge' which featured the bands music. Also announced was the World Tour for 2021/22 including dates in the UK, USA, Japan and Europe. On 23 June, the band commenced their first tour in two and a half years with the US 'Get Out of the House' tour, starting at the Kelsey Theatre in Lake Park Florida. This was the first show ever with Glenn Hughes. On 6 August, the single 'My Fate' was released on digital platforms. On 13 August, a short film inspired by the recent US tour and song 'Like No Other' was premiered with an inspiring and positive message going forward and leading back to live music once more. The band kicked off the 'Like No Other' Tour 2021 in the US on 10 September 10 in Rockford Illinois. On the 17 September 'Saving Grace' was released as a single on digital platforms and the October/November UK dates were announced. The band had a very successful run of shows in the UK with packed out audiences at the Shepherds Bush O2 Empire in London and Rock City in Nottingham as well as, Birmingham, Liverpool, Bristol, Oxford, Norwich and Cardiff.

2022 saw the band kick off the year with best Album at the Banger Awards in the USA. This was followed by the announcement on 24 January that drummer Brian Tichy would be rejoining the collective. The first release of the year was a live recording of 'Rise Up' recorded in Nottingham on the UK 2021 Like No Other tour as part of a series of live tracks called Live from Daisyland. 

On June 3rd, the band embarked on their first European tour in over three years with some headline shows, festival shows and guest slots to Foreigner and Judas Priest. The band released their first new single from their forthcoming album at the end of May. 'Radiance' was released with a new animated video and online platform with the alternate version of the band, The Meta Daisies. Working with Avakin Life you could spend some time in a virtual bar with fellow fans listening to the track. This was followed by the next single 'Shine On' to coincide with the European tour. This was followed by 'Hypnotize Yourself' in August with the fourth single 'Face Your Fear' coming on 2nd September. The band embarked on their latest US Tour on 7th September starting at the Landis Theater in Vineland, New Jersey and finishing at The Crocodile in Seattle on 24th September. On the 30th September, the latest album 'Radiance' was released to rave reviews all over the planet. November 11th saw the release of the latest single 'Born To Fly' inspired by David Lowy's flying background ahead of the UK tour beginning on December 3rd in Nottingham.

Band membersCurrent collective members David Lowy – rhythm guitar 
 Brian Tichy – drums 
 Doug Aldrich – lead guitar, backing vocals 
 Glenn Hughes – lead vocals, bass Collective members Richard Fortus – lead guitar 
 Dizzy Reed – keyboards, backing vocals 
 Jon Stevens – lead vocals, acoustic guitar 
 Charley Drayton – drums 
 Marco Mendoza – bass, backing vocals 
 Darryl Jones – bass, backing vocals 
 Alex Carapetis – drums 
 Alan Mansfield – keyboards  
 Clayton Doley – keyboards 
 Frank Ferrer – drums 
 John Tempesta – drums 
 John Corabi – lead vocals 
 Tommy Clufetos – drums 
 Jackie Barnes – drums 
 Damon Johnson – rhythm guitar 
 Dave Leslie – lead guitar 
 Deen Castronovo – drums, backing vocals, lead vocals, percussion 

DiscographyStudio albums'''The Dead Daisies (2013)Revolución (2015)Make Some Noise (2016)Burn It Down (2018)Holy Ground (2021)Radiance'' (2022)

References

External links
 The Dead Daisies Official Site
 Former JOURNEY Drummer Deen Castronovo Joins THE DEAD DAISIES BLABBERMOUTH.NET
 Ex Journey Drummer Deen Castronovo Joins The Dead Daisies Ultimate Classic Rock
 The Dead Daisies announce 2018 UK and European tour TeamRock

Rock music supergroups
Australian rock music groups
Australian hard rock musical groups